William Willis Garth (October 28, 1828 – February 25, 1912) was an American politician.  He served as a representative of the Alabama's 8th Congressional District in the U.S. House of Representatives between March 4, 1877, and March 3, 1879.

Garth was born on October 28, 1828, in Morgan County, Alabama. He pursued classical studies at Lagrange, Virginia and at Emory and Henry College, Emory, Virginia, and studied law at the University of Virginia. He was admitted to the Alabama bar and practiced law at Huntsville, Alabama. During the Civil War, he served as a lieutenant colonel on the staff of General James Longstreet in the Confederate Army.

Garth was elected in 1876 as a Democratic representative to the 45th Congress, but was defeated for reelection in 1878. He resumed the practice of law, and died in Huntsville, Alabama on February 25, 1912. He was buried in Maple Hill Cemetery in Huntsville.

References

External links

1828 births
1912 deaths
19th-century American lawyers
19th-century American politicians
Alabama lawyers
Confederate States Army officers
Democratic Party members of the United States House of Representatives from Alabama
Military personnel from Huntsville, Alabama
Politicians from Huntsville, Alabama